Kota Lama is a state constituency in Kelantan, Malaysia, that has been represented in the Kelantan State Legislative Assembly since 1995.

The state constituency was created in the 1994 redistribution and is mandated to return a single member to the Kelantan State Legislative Assembly under the first past the post voting system.

Demographics

History

Polling districts 
According to the gazette issued on 30 March 2018, the Kota Lama constituency has a total of 12 polling districts.

Representation history

Election results

References

Kelantan state constituencies